Anthony Graham Brown  (born October 30, 1954), known professionally as T. Graham Brown, is an American country music singer. Active since 1973, Brown has recorded a total of thirteen studio albums, and has charted more than twenty singles on the Billboard Hot Country Songs chart. Three of these singles — "Hell and High Water" and "Don't Go to Strangers" from 1986, and "Darlene" from 1988 — reached Number One, and eight more made Top Ten.

Biography
Brown was born in 1954 in Arabi, Georgia. He first performed in a duo, Dirk & Tony (1973–75) before founding two more bands, "Reo Diamond" (1975) and "T. Graham Brown's Rack of Spam" (1979). He married his wife Sheila in 1980; the couple has a son, Acme Geronimo Brown (born 1989).

Musical career
Brown moved to Nashville in 1982 and found work singing advertising jingles for companies such as McDonald's, Disneyland, Budweiser, Coors, Stroh's, Almond Joy, Coca-Cola, Sears, Dodge Trucks, Ford, Hardee's, Kentucky Fried Chicken, The Nashville Network, B.C.Powders, Dr Pepper, Mountain Dew, 7-Up, Harrah's and many others. He was also the singing narrator in the Taco Bell "Run For the Border" television spots. Brown also found work as a songwriter for E.M.I. Publishing before signing to Capitol Records in 1984. He was with E.M.I. for 13 years. Brown's first release for the label, "Drowning in Memories", peaked at No.39 on the Billboard country charts. The title song of his debut album "I Tell It Like It Used To Be" went to No.7, followed by "I Wish That I Could Hurt That Way Again" to No.4, giving way to a pair of number ones, "Hell and High Water" and "Don't Go To Strangers".

Brown's first release for the label, "Drowning in Memories", peaked at No. 39 and was never included on an album. After it came the No. 7 "I Tell It Like It Used to Be", the first single from his 1986 album of the same name. Counting its title track, this album accounted for four singles: the No. 3 "I Wish That I Could Hurt That Way Again" and two straight Number Ones in "Hell and High Water" and "Don't Go to Strangers".

Brown's second album for the label, Brilliant Conversationalist, followed a year later. Although none of its singles went to Number One, it accounted for three more Top Ten hits in its title track, followed by "She Couldn't Love Me Anymore" and "Last Resort". A third album, 1988's Come as You Were, produced his third and final Number One in "Darlene". Then came the No. 7 title track and No. 30 "Never Say Never". In early 1990, he sang guest vocals on the multi-artist charity single "Tomorrow's World", as well as Tanya Tucker's single "Don't Go Out", from her album Tennessee Woman.

1990 also saw the release of his next album, Bumper to Bumper. This album's lead-off single "If You Could Only See Me Now" went Top Ten with a No. 6 peak, but the other singles — the No. 18 "Moonshadow Road" and No. 53 "I'm Sending One Up for You" — did not fare as well, with the latter being his first single to land outside the Top 40. That same year, he also released an unsuccessful greatest-hits package. His next album, You Can't Take It with You, only accounted for the No. 31 "With This Ring" before he exited Capitol in 1991.

Brown did not record another album until 1998's Wine into Water on the Intersound label. This album produced four more singles for him, although the No. 44 title track was the highest-charting single from it. The subject matter of the lyrics of the song surrounded Brown's then ongoing fight against alcoholism. He then released two more independent albums: The Next Right Thing in 2003 and The Present in 2006.

Brown joined Broadway icon Carol Channing for a duet of "Don't Sit Under The Apple Tree" on her 2012 album True To The Red, White, and Blue. He also recorded a duet of "You Are So Beautiful" with Lulu Roman (of Hee Haw fame) for her 2013 album At Last. In 2012, Brown appeared on a Country/Gospel album

In 2014, Brown again collaborated with producer Mark Carman to produce the Grammy-nominated album, Forever Changed, featuring guest appearances by industry giants; Leon Russell, The Oak Ridge Boys, Steve Cropper, Jeff and Sheri Easter, The Booth Brothers, Three Bridges, Jimmy Fortune, Sonya Isaacs, and Jason Crabb. In July 2014 the first single from the album was released on the MCM World Media Label. The song, "He'll Take Care of You" was written by well known, award-winning songwriters; Dan Penn, Gary Nicholson, and Donnie Fritts.

Discography

Albums

Live albums

Compilation albums

Singles

Guest singles

Music videos

Guest appearances

References

External links
 
 

1954 births
American male singer-songwriters
American country singer-songwriters
Living people
Capitol Records artists
People from Crisp County, Georgia
Country musicians from Georgia (U.S. state)
Singer-songwriters from Georgia (U.S. state)